Arakeri is a small village in Bijapur district, Karnataka, India. It is around 14 km from Bijapur city, located near to the Solapur, Mangalore highway.

Villages in Bijapur district, Karnataka